Kyle Croxall (born October 26, 1988) is a Canadian Red Bull Crashed Ice (also known as ice cross downhill) racer. In January 2014, he was ranked fourth in the world in the sport. Croxall is a former ice hockey player who played one season with the Mississauga Chargers of the Ontario Junior A Hockey League.

Crashed ice career
Croxall's ice cross downhill career began while he was going to school for firefighting in Ottawa, Ontario. In 2007, tryouts were being held there. Croxall said, "I had previously seen the sport on TV and wanted to join." Croxall tried out for Crashed Ice and went on to his first race in Quebec City in 2008. Croxall now competes on the Red Bull Crashed Ice tour for the team known as "Living The Dream".

Croxall has individually been ranked second (2010, 2011, 2013) and first (2012) in the Red Bull Crashed Ice Men's Individual World Championship rankings. As part of the "Living The Dream" team, he has been ranked third (2013) and second (2014) in the Red Bull Crashed Ice Team World Championship rankings. Apart from the world championship rankings, he has six first-place finishes, two second-place finishes and two third-place finishes in Men's Individual Races.

Personal life
Croxall was born in Mississauga, Ontario, and he is residing in Toronto. He is now a firefighter with the Toronto Fire Services. His brother, Scott Croxall, is also an ice cross downhill athlete.

References

External links

1988 births
Living people
Canadian firefighters
Canadian ice hockey players
Ice hockey people from Ontario
Sportspeople from Mississauga
Sportspeople from Toronto